David Segundo Peralta (3 March 1897– possibly 7 January 1940), also known as Mate Cosido, a nickname given to him because of a scar on his forehead, was a notorious Argentine outlaw, train and bank robber, and rural bandit in north-eastern Argentina.

Biography

He was born on 3 March 1897 in Monteros, Tucumán Province, Argentina.

On 7 January 1940, he was shot in the hip by Gendarmeria Nacional Argentina while collecting the ransom from the kidnapping of a rancher in Villa Berthet, Chaco province. He was never seen again, and it is believed that he died from his wounds.

Criminal Acts
He arrived in the province of Chaco around 1926 from Asunción and then from Corrientes. In police files from Tucumán, Córdoba and Santiago del Estero, David Segundo Peralta, alias "Mate Cosido" (1916-1924) is recorded.

Although his nickname is sometimes confused with the name of the "mate cocido" infusion, the real nickname is "mate cosido", in reference to a scar on his head, called "mate" in popular jargon. Both phrases have the same pronunciation.

His personality was that of a cultured man, he behaved with humility and education, paying generously for the slightest service received, and thus gained appreciation and popularity. He put together the robberies in detail. The powerful companies that he robbed (Bunge y Born, Dreyfus, La Forestal) made every effort to capture him. The urban legend claimed that he stole from rich companies - most of them foreign - to help the poor. In turn, the legend rounded off his behavior asserting that the frightening manner of his actions was set up by the very companies that "robbed the people of Chaco."

Mate Cosido called himself a bandit of the poor, writing articles in magazines, explaining the reasons for his robberies, and claiming he stole from the rich to give to the poor.

In his criminal career he used false documents easily available in Buenos Aires, under names like Julio del Prado, Manuel Bertolatti, José Amaya or Julio Blanco.

He avoided violence as much as he could and never had any armed confrontations with the police. It was not out of fear, but a way of proceeding.

With the anarchist and bandit from the Pampas, Juan Bautista Bairoletto, they planned to rob a tannin factory, however, Peralta gave up because he did not agree with what he supposed would happen: Bairoletto carried out the robbery, leaving an employee dead in the shootout with the police.

The inhabitants of Presidente Roque Sáenz Peña, of Gancedo, and ultimately most of the large towns, sympathized with Mate Cosido’s actions. He would go around disguised as a rural laborer or as a salesman so as not to arouse suspicion.

His fame reached Buenos Aires. On 22 December 1939, Mate Cosido's gang kidnapped rancher Jacinto Berzón. The ransom request for 50,000 Argentine pesos came with precise instructions: the money would be thrown, on 7 January 1940, from the train, before the Villa Berthet Railway Station, Chaco. But as a result of a shootout with police, Peralta was badly injured in the hip.

After this episode he did not make public appearances again, and if he died, his remains were not found either.

Popular culture 
A friend of David Peralda, another "bandolero" so they called him The second David Peralta. An anarchist who defended the fact of being a thief and considered himself a victim of the privileged and a fabrication of the different kinds of social injustice and a corrupt and unfair police system.
A Leon Gieco's song about the rural bandits in Argentina tells part of his story.

Songs inspired by Mate Cosido 
León Gieco composed a song called "Bandidos rurales" where he tells the life of famous Argentine bandits, with a good part dedicated to Mate Cosido.

Adrián Abonizio composed a song called "Historia de Mate Cosido", which was later popularized by Juan Carlos Baglietto.

Nélida Argentina Zenón composed a classic chamamé called "Mate Cosido", which was recorded by herself and several other performers.

References

External links
 https://web.archive.org/web/20120701070418/http://www.diagonalurbana.com.ar/leyendas/mate_cocido.html
 http://www.lagazeta.com.ar/matecosido.htm

Argentine outlaws
Chaco Province
People from Tucumán Province
1897 births
1940 deaths
Year of death uncertain